The Battle of Tellaru was fought in 830 between the forces of the Pallava King Nandivarman III and the Pandyan King Srimara Srivallabha. The Pandyan forces were defeated.

Notes

References 

9th century in India
Pandyan dynasty
Pallava dynasty
Tellaru